The Black Sea is a marginal mediterranean sea of the Atlantic Ocean lying between Europe and Asia, east of the Balkans, south of the East European Plain, west of the Caucasus, and north of Anatolia. It is bounded by Bulgaria, Georgia, Romania, Russia, Turkey, and Ukraine. The Black Sea is supplied by major rivers, principally the Danube, Dnieper, and Don. Consequently, while six countries have a coastline on the sea, its drainage basin includes parts of 24 countries in Europe.

Most of its coasts ascend rapidly.
These rises are the Pontic Mountains to the south, bar the southwest-facing peninsulas, the Caucasus Mountains to the east, and the Crimean Mountains to the mid-north.
In the west, the coast is generally small floodplains below foothills such as the Strandzha; Cape Emine, a dwindling of the east end of the Balkan Mountains; and the Dobruja Plateau considerably farther north.
Important cities along the coast include (clockwise from the Bosporus) Burgas, Varna, Constanța, Odesa, Sevastopol, Novorossiysk, Sochi, Batumi, Trabzon and Samsun.

While the net flow of water through the Bosporus and Dardanelles (known collectively as the Turkish Straits) is out of the Black Sea, water generally flows in both directions simultaneously: Denser, more saline water from the Aegean flows into the Black Sea underneath the less dense, fresher water that flows out of the Black Sea. This creates a significant and permanent layer of deep water that does not drain or mix and is therefore anoxic. This anoxic layer is responsible for the preservation of ancient shipwrecks which have been found in the Black Sea.

The Black Sea ultimately drains into the Mediterranean Sea, via the Turkish Straits and the Aegean Sea. The Bosporus strait connects it to the small Sea of Marmara which in turn is connected to the Aegean Sea via the strait of the Dardanelles. To the north, the Black Sea is connected to the Sea of Azov by the Kerch Strait.

The water level has varied significantly over geological time. Due to these variations in the water level in the basin, the surrounding shelf and associated aprons have sometimes been dry land. At certain critical water levels, connections with surrounding water bodies can become established. It is through the most active of these connective routes, the Turkish Straits, that the Black Sea joins the world ocean. During geological periods when this hydrological link was not present, the Black Sea was an endorheic basin, operating independently of the global ocean system (similar to the Caspian Sea today). Currently, the Black Sea water level is relatively high; thus, water is being exchanged with the Mediterranean. The Black Sea undersea river is a current of particularly saline water flowing through the Bosporus Strait and along the seabed of the Black Sea, the first of its kind discovered.

Name

Modern names
Current names of the sea are usually equivalents of the English name "Black Sea", including these given in the countries bordering the sea:
 , 
 , 
 , 
 , 
  
 , shavi zghva 
 , 
 , 
 , 
 , 

Such names have not yet been shown conclusively to predate the 13th century.

In Greece, the historical name "Euxine Sea", which holds a different meaning (see below), is still widely used:
"Hospitable Sea"; the name , lit. "Black Sea" is used, but is much less common.

Historical names and etymology
The earliest known name of the Black Sea is the Sea of Zalpa, so called by both the Hattians and their conquerors the Hittites. The Hattic city of Zalpa was “situated probably at or near the estuary of the Marrassantiya River, the modern Kızıl Irmak, on the Black Sea coast.”

The principal Greek name Póntos Áxeinos is generally accepted to be a rendering of the Iranian word  ("dark coloured"). The name   (Inhospitable Sea), first attested in Pindar, was considered an ill omen and was euphemized to its opposite,   (Hospitable Sea), also first attested in Pindar. This became the commonly used designation in Greek, although in mythological contexts the "true" name  remained favoured.

Strabo's Geographica (1.2.10) reports that in antiquity, the Black Sea was often simply called "the Sea". He thought that the sea was called the "Inhospitable Sea   by the inhabitants of the Pontus region of the southern shoreline before Greek colonisation due to its difficult navigation and hostile barbarian natives (7.3.6), and that the name was changed to "hospitable" after the Milesians colonised the region, bringing it into the Greek world.

Popular supposition derives "Black Sea" from the dark colour of the water or climatic conditions. Some scholars understand the name to be derived from a system of colour symbolism representing the cardinal directions, with black or dark for north, red for south, white for west, and green or light blue for east. Hence "Black Sea" meant "Northern Sea". According to this scheme, the name could only have originated with a people living between the northern (black) and southern (red) seas, pointing to the Achaemenids (550–330  BC), although Turkic peoples also marked the directions with colours.

In the Greater Bundahishn, a Middle Persian Zoroastrian scripture, the Black Sea is called . In the tenth-century Persian geography book , the Black Sea is called Georgian Sea. The Georgian Chronicles use the name   (Sea of Speri) after the Kartvelian tribe of Speris or Saspers. A 1570 map  from Abraham Ortelius's  labels the sea  (Great Sea), compare Latin .

English writers of the 18th century often used Euxine Sea ( or ).

Geography 
The International Hydrographic Organization defines the limits of the Black Sea as follows:

The area surrounding the Black Sea is commonly referred to as the Black Sea Region. Its northern part lies within the Chernozem belt (black soil belt) which goes from eastern Croatia (Slavonia), along the Danube (northern Serbia, northern Bulgaria (Danubian Plain) and southern Romania (Wallachian Plain)) to northeast Ukraine and further across the Central Black Earth Region and southern Russia into Siberia.

The littoral zone of the Black Sea is often referred to as the Pontic littoral or Pontic zone.

The largest bays of the Black Sea are Karkinit Bay in Ukraine; the Gulf of Burgas in Bulgaria; Dnieprovski Bay and Dniestrovski Bay, both in Ukraine; and Sinop Bay and Samsun Bay, both in Turkey.

Coastline and exclusive economic zones

{| class="wikitable sortable" style="text-align:right;"
|+ Coastline length and area of exclusive economic zones
|-
!scope="col"| Country
!scope="col"| Coastline length (km)
!scope="col"| Exclusive economic zones area (km2)
|-
!scope="row"| 
| 1,329
| 172,484
|-
!scope="row"| 
| 2,782
| 132,414
|-
!scope="row"| 
| 800
| 67,351
|-
!scope="row"| 
| 354
| 35,132
|-
!scope="row"| 
| 310
| 22,947
|-
!scope="row"| 
| 225
| 29,756
|- class="sortbottom" style="background:#9acdff;"
!scope="row"| Total
| style="background:#9acdff; font-weight:bold;"| 5,800
| style="background:#9acdff; font-weight:bold;"| 460,084
|}

Drainage basin 

The largest rivers flowing into the Black Sea are:

 Danube
 Dnieper
 Don
 Dniester
 Kızılırmak
 Kuban
 Sakarya
 Southern Bug
 Çoruh
 Yeşilırmak
 Rioni
 Yeya
 Mius
 Kamchiya
 Enguri
 Kalmius
 Molochna
 Tylihul
 Velykyi Kuialnyk
 Veleka
 Rezovo
 Kodori
 Bzyb
 Supsa
 Mzymta

These rivers and their tributaries comprise a  Black Sea drainage basin that covers wholly or partially 24 countries:

Islands 
Some islands in the Black Sea belong to Bulgaria, Romania, Turkey, and Ukraine:

 St. Thomas Island – Bulgaria
 St. Anastasia Island – Bulgaria
 St. Cyricus Island – Bulgaria
 St. Ivan Island – Bulgaria
 St. Peter Island – Bulgaria
 Sacalinu Mare Island – Romania
 Sacalinu Mic Island – Romania
 Misura / Novaya Zemliya – Romania and Ukraine
 Utrish Island
 Krupinin Island
 Sudiuk Island
 Kefken Island
 Oreke Island
 Giresun Island - Turkey
 Dzharylgach Island – Ukraine
 Zmiinyi (Snake) Island – Ukraine

Climate 

Short-term climatic variation in the Black Sea region is significantly influenced by the operation of the North Atlantic oscillation, the climatic mechanisms resulting from the interaction between the north Atlantic and mid-latitude air masses. While the exact mechanisms causing the North Atlantic Oscillation remain unclear, it is thought the climate conditions established in western Europe mediate the heat and precipitation fluxes reaching Central Europe and Eurasia, regulating the formation of winter cyclones, which are largely responsible for regional precipitation inputs and influence Mediterranean sea surface temperatures (SSTs).

The relative strength of these systems also limits the amount of cold air arriving from northern regions during winter. Other influencing factors include the regional topography, as depressions and storm systems arriving from the Mediterranean are funneled through the low land around the Bosporus, with the Pontic and Caucasus mountain ranges acting as waveguides, limiting the speed and paths of cyclones passing through the region.

Geology and bathymetry 

The Black Sea is divided into two depositional basins—the Western Black Sea and Eastern Black Sea—separated by the Mid-Black Sea High, which includes the Andrusov Ridge, Tetyaev High, and Archangelsky High, extending south from the Crimean Peninsula. The basin includes two distinct relict back-arc basins which were initiated by the splitting of an Albian volcanic arc and the subduction of both the Paleo- and Neo-Tethys oceans, but the timings of these events remain uncertain. Arc volcanism and extension occurred as the Neo-Tethys Ocean subducted under the southern margin of Laurasia during the Mesozoic. Uplift and compressional deformation took place as the Neotethys continued to close. Seismic surveys indicate that rifting began in the Western Black Sea in the Barremian and Aptian followed by the formation of oceanic crust 20 million years later in the Santonian. Since its initiation, compressional tectonic environments led to subsidence in the basin, interspersed with extensional phases resulting in large-scale volcanism and numerous orogenies, causing the uplift of the Greater Caucasus, Pontides, southern Crimean Peninsula and Balkanides mountain ranges.

During the Messinian salinity crisis in the neighboring Mediterranean Sea, water levels fell but without drying up the sea. The collision between the Eurasian and African plates and the westward escape of the Anatolian block along the North Anatolian and East Anatolian faults dictates the current tectonic regime, which features enhanced subsidence in the Black Sea basin and significant volcanic activity in the Anatolian region. These geological mechanisms, in the long term, have caused the periodic isolations of the Black Sea from the rest of the global ocean system.

The southern edge around Turkey and the eastern edge around Georgia, however, are typified by a narrow shelf that rarely exceeds  in width and a steep apron that is typically 1:40 gradient with numerous submarine canyons and channel extensions. The Euxine abyssal plain in the centre of the Black Sea reaches a maximum depth of  just south of Yalta on the Crimean Peninsula.

Chronostratigraphy 
The Paleo-Euxinian is described by the accumulation of eolian silt deposits (related to the Riss glaciation) and the lowering of sea levels (MIS 6, 8 and 10). The Karangat marine transgression occurred during the Eemian Interglacial (MIS 5e). This may have been the highest sea levels reached in the late Pleistocene. Based on this some scholars have suggested that the Crimean Peninsula was isolated from the mainland by a shallow strait during the Eemian Interglacial.

The Neoeuxinian transgression began with an inflow of waters from the Caspian Sea. Neoeuxinian deposits are found in the Black Sea below  water depth in three layers. The upper layers correspond with the peak of the Khvalinian transgression, on the shelf shallow-water sands and coquina mixed with silty sands and brackish-water fauna, and inside the Black Sea Depression hydrotroilite silts. The middle layers on the shelf are sands with brackish-water mollusc shells. Of continental origin, the lower level on the shelf is mostly alluvial sands with pebbles, mixed with less common lacustrine silts and freshwater mollusc shells. Inside the Black Sea Depression they are terrigenous non-carbonate silts, and at the foot of the continental slope turbidite sediments.

Hydrology

The Black Sea is the world's largest body of water with a meromictic basin. The deep waters do not mix with the upper layers of water that receive oxygen from the atmosphere. As a result, over 90% of the deeper Black Sea volume is anoxic water. The Black Sea's circulation patterns are primarily controlled by basin topography and fluvial inputs, which result in a strongly stratified vertical structure. Because of the extreme stratification, it is classified as a salt wedge estuary.

The Black Sea experiences water transfer only with the Mediterranean Sea, so all inflow and outflow occurs through the Bosporus and Dardanelles. Inflow from the Mediterranean has a higher salinity and density than the outflow, creating the classic estuarine circulation. This means that the inflow of dense water from the Mediterranean occurs at the bottom of the basin while the outflow of fresher Black Sea surface-water into the Sea of Marmara occurs near the surface.
 
The following water budget can be estimated:
 Water IN: 
 Total river discharge: 
 Precipitation: 
 Inflow via Bosporus: 
 Water OUT: 
 Evaporation:  (reduced greatly since the 1970s)
 Outflow via Bosporus: 

This allows for turbulent mixing of the two layers. Surface water leaves the Black Sea with a salinity of 17 practical salinity units (PSU) and reaches the Mediterranean with a salinity of 34 PSU. Likewise, an inflow of the Mediterranean with salinity 38.5 PSU experiences a decrease to about 34 PSU.

Mean surface circulation is cyclonic; waters around the perimeter of the Black Sea circulate in a basin-wide shelfbreak gyre known as the Rim Current. Within this feature, two smaller cyclonic gyres operate, occupying the eastern and western sectors of the basin. The Eastern and Western Gyres are well-organized systems in the winter but dissipate into a series of interconnected eddies in the summer and autumn. Mesoscale activity in the peripheral flow becomes more pronounced during these warmer seasons and is subject to interannual variability.

Outside of the Rim Current, numerous quasi-permanent coastal eddies are formed as a result of upwelling around the coastal apron and "wind curl" mechanisms. The intra-annual strength of these features is controlled by seasonal atmospheric and fluvial variations. During the spring, the Batumi eddy forms in the southeastern corner of the sea.

Beneath the surface waters—from about —there exists a halocline that stops at the Cold Intermediate Layer (CIL). This layer is composed of cool, salty surface waters, which are the result of localized atmospheric cooling and decreased fluvial input during the winter months. It is the remnant of the winter surface mixed layer.

The hydrochemical environment shifts from oxygenated to anoxic, as bacterial decomposition of sunken biomass utilizes all of the free oxygen. Weak geothermal heating and long residence time create a very thick convective bottom layer.

The Black Sea undersea river is a current of particularly saline water flowing through the Bosporus Strait and along the seabed of the Black Sea. The discovery of the river, announced on August 1, 2010, was made by scientists at the University of Leeds and is the first of its kind to be identified. The undersea river stems from salty water spilling through the Bosporus Strait from the Mediterranean Sea into the Black Sea, where the water has a lower salt content.

Hydrochemistry
Because of the anoxic water at depth, organic matter, including anthropogenic artifacts such as boat hulls, are well preserved. During periods of high surface productivity, short-lived algal blooms form organic rich layers known as sapropels. Scientists have reported an annual phytoplankton bloom that can be seen in many NASA images of the region. As a result of these characteristics the Black Sea has gained interest from the field of marine archaeology, as ancient shipwrecks in excellent states of preservation have been discovered, such as the Byzantine wreck Sinop D, located in the anoxic layer off the coast of Sinop, Turkey.

Modelling shows that, in the event of an asteroid impact on the Black Sea, the release of hydrogen sulfide clouds would pose a threat to health—and perhaps even life—for people living on the Black Sea coast.

There have been isolated reports of flares on the Black Sea occurring during thunderstorms, possibly caused by lightning igniting combustible gas seeping up from the sea depths.

Ecology

Marine

The Black Sea supports an active and dynamic marine ecosystem, dominated by species suited to the brackish, nutrient-rich, conditions. As with all marine food webs, the Black Sea features a range of trophic groups, with autotrophic algae, including diatoms and dinoflagellates, acting as primary producers. The fluvial systems draining Eurasia and central Europe introduce large volumes of sediment and dissolved nutrients into the Black Sea, but the distribution of these nutrients is controlled by the degree of physiochemical stratification, which is, in turn, dictated by seasonal physiographic development.

During winter, strong wind promotes convective overturning and upwelling of nutrients, while high summer temperatures result in a marked vertical stratification and a warm, shallow mixed layer. Day length and insolation intensity also control the extent of the photic zone. Subsurface productivity is limited by nutrient availability, as the anoxic bottom waters act as a sink for reduced nitrate, in the form of ammonia. The benthic zone also plays an important role in Black Sea nutrient cycling, as chemosynthetic organisms and anoxic geochemical pathways recycle nutrients which can be upwelled to the photic zone, enhancing productivity.

In total, the Black Sea's biodiversity contains around one-third of the Mediterranean's and is experiencing natural and artificial invasions or "Mediterranizations".

Phytoplankton

The main phytoplankton groups present in the Black Sea are dinoflagellates, diatoms, coccolithophores and cyanobacteria. Generally, the annual cycle of phytoplankton development comprises significant diatom and dinoflagellate-dominated spring production, followed by a weaker mixed assemblage of community development below the seasonal thermocline during summer months, and surface-intensified autumn production. This pattern of productivity is augmented by an Emiliania huxleyi bloom during the late spring and summer months.
 Dinoflagellates
 Annual dinoflagellate distribution is defined by an extended bloom period in subsurface waters during the late spring and summer. In November, subsurface plankton production is combined with surface production, due to vertical mixing of water masses and nutrients such as nitrite. The major bloom-forming dinoflagellate species in the Black Sea is Gymnodinium sp. Estimates of dinoflagellate diversity in the Black Sea range from 193 to 267 species. This level of species richness is relatively low in comparison to the Mediterranean Sea, which is attributable to the brackish conditions, low water transparency and presence of anoxic bottom waters. It is also possible that the low winter temperatures below  of the Black Sea prevent thermophilous species from becoming established. The relatively high organic matter content of Black Sea surface water favor the development of heterotrophic (an organism that uses organic carbon for growth) and mixotrophic dinoflagellates species (able to exploit different trophic pathways), relative to autotrophs. Despite its unique hydrographic setting, there are no confirmed endemic dinoflagellate species in the Black Sea.
 Diatoms
 The Black Sea is populated by many species of the marine diatom, which commonly exist as colonies of unicellular, non-motile auto- and heterotrophic algae. The life-cycle of most diatoms can be described as 'boom and bust' and the Black Sea is no exception, with diatom blooms occurring in surface waters throughout the year, most reliably during March. In simple terms, the phase of rapid population growth in diatoms is caused by the in-wash of silicon-bearing terrestrial sediments, and when the supply of silicon is exhausted, the diatoms begin to sink out of the photic zone and produce resting cysts. Additional factors such as predation by zooplankton and ammonium-based regenerated production also have a role to play in the annual diatom cycle. Typically,  blooms during spring and  blooms during the autumn.
 Coccolithophores
 Coccolithophores are a type of motile, autotrophic phytoplankton that produce CaCO3 plates, known as coccoliths, as part of their life cycle. In the Black Sea, the main period of coccolithophore growth occurs after the bulk of the dinoflagellate growth has taken place. In May, the dinoflagellates move below the seasonal thermocline into deeper waters, where more nutrients are available. This permits coccolithophores to utilize the nutrients in the upper waters, and by the end of May, with favorable light and temperature conditions, growth rates reach their highest.
 Cyanobacteria
 Cyanobacteria are a phylum of picoplanktonic (plankton ranging in size from 0.2 to 2.0 µm) bacteria that obtain their energy via photosynthesis, and are present throughout the world's oceans. They exhibit a range of morphologies, including filamentous colonies and biofilms. In the Black Sea, several species are present, and as an example, Synechococcus spp. can be found throughout the photic zone, although concentration decreases with increasing depth. Other factors which exert an influence on distribution include nutrient availability, predation, and salinity.

Animal species
 Zebra mussel
 The Black Sea along with the Caspian Sea is part of the zebra mussel's native range. The mussel has been accidentally introduced around the world and become an invasive species where it has been introduced.
 Common carp
 The common carp's native range extends to the Black Sea along with the Caspian Sea and Aral Sea. Like the zebra mussel, the common carp is an invasive species when introduced to other habitats.
 Round goby
 Another native fish that is also found in the Caspian Sea. It preys upon zebra mussels. Like the mussels and common carp, it has become invasive when introduced to other environments, like the Great Lakes in North America.
 Marine mammals and marine megafauna
 Marine mammals present within the basin include two species of dolphin (common and bottlenose) and the harbour porpoise, although all of these are endangered due to pressures and impacts by human activities. All three species have been classified as distinct subspecies from those in the Mediterranean and the Atlantic and are endemic to the Black and Azov seas, and are more active during nights in the Turkish Straits. However, construction of the Crimean Bridge has caused increases in nutrients and planktons in the waters, attracting large numbers of fish and more than 1,000 bottlenose dolphins. However, others claim that construction may cause devastating damages on the ecosystem, including dolphins.
 Mediterranean monk seals, now critically endangered, were historically abundant in the Black Sea, and are regarded to have become extinct from the basin in 1997. Very few animals still thrive in the Sea of Marmara.
 Ongoing Mediterranizations may or may not boost cetacean diversity in the Turkish Straits and hence in the Black and Azov basins.
 Various species of pinnipeds, sea otter, and beluga whale were introduced into the Black Sea by mankind and later escaped either by accidental or purported causes. Of these, grey seals and beluga whales have been recorded with successful, long-term occurrences.
 Great white sharks are known to reach into the Sea of Marmara and Bosporus Strait and basking sharks into the Dardanelles, although it is unclear whether or not these sharks may reach into the Black and Azov basins.

Ecological effects of pollution
Since the 1960s, rapid industrial expansion along the Black Sea coastline and the construction of a major dam has significantly increased annual variability in the N:P:Si ratio in the basin. In coastal areas, the biological effect of these changes has been an increase in the frequency of monospecific phytoplankton blooms, with diatom bloom frequency increasing by a factor of 2.5 and non-diatom bloom frequency increasing by a factor of 6. The non-diatoms, such as the prymnesiophytes  (coccolithophore),  sp., and the Euglenophyte , are able to out-compete diatom species because of the limited availability of silicon, a necessary constituent of diatom frustules. As a consequence of these blooms, benthic macrophyte populations were deprived of light, while anoxia caused mass mortality in marine animals.

The decline in macrophytes was further compounded by overfishing during the 1970s, while the invasive ctenophore Mnemiopsis reduced the biomass of copepods and other zooplankton in the late 1980s. Additionally, an alien species—the warty comb jelly—was able to establish itself in the basin, exploding from a few individuals to an estimated biomass of one billion metric tons. The change in species composition in Black Sea waters also has consequences for hydrochemistry, as calcium-producing coccolithophores influence salinity and pH, although these ramifications have yet to be fully quantified. In central Black Sea waters, silicon levels were also significantly reduced, due to a decrease in the flux of silicon associated with advection across isopycnal surfaces. This phenomenon demonstrates the potential for localized alterations in Black Sea nutrient input to have basin-wide effects.

Pollution reduction and regulation efforts have led to a partial recovery of the Black Sea ecosystem during the 1990s, and an EU monitoring exercise, 'EROS21', revealed decreased nitrogen and phosphorus values, relative to the 1989 peak. Recently, scientists have noted signs of ecological recovery, in part due to the construction of new sewage treatment plants in Slovakia, Hungary, Romania, and Bulgaria in connection with membership in the European Union.  populations have been checked with the arrival of another alien species which feeds on them.

History

Mediterranean connection during the Holocene

The Black Sea is connected to the World Ocean by a chain of two shallow straits, the Dardanelles and the Bosporus. By comparison, at the height of the last ice age, sea levels were more than  lower than they are now.

There is evidence that water levels in the Black Sea were considerably lower at some point during the post-glacial period. Some researchers theorize that the Black Sea had been a landlocked freshwater lake (at least in upper layers) during the last glaciation and for some time after.

In the aftermath of the last glacial period, water levels in the Black Sea and the Aegean Sea rose independently until they were high enough to exchange water. The exact timeline of this development is still subject to debate. One possibility is that the Black Sea filled first, with excess freshwater flowing over the Bosporus sill and eventually into the Mediterranean Sea. There are also catastrophic scenarios, such as the "Black Sea deluge hypothesis" put forward by William Ryan, Walter Pitman and Petko Dimitrov.

Deluge hypothesis

The Black Sea deluge is a hypothesized catastrophic rise in the level of the Black Sea circa 5600 BC due to waters from the Mediterranean Sea breaching a sill in the Bosporus Strait. The hypothesis was headlined when The New York Times published it in December 1996, shortly before it was published in an academic journal. While it is agreed that the sequence of events described did occur, there is debate over the suddenness, dating, and magnitude of the events. Relevant to the hypothesis is that its description has led some to connect this catastrophe with prehistoric flood myths.

Recorded history

The Black Sea was a busy waterway on the crossroads of the ancient world: the Balkans to the west, the Eurasian steppes to the north, the Caucasus and Central Asia to the east, Asia Minor and Mesopotamia to the south, and Greece to the southwest.

The land at the eastern end of the Black Sea, Colchis (in present-day Georgia), marked for the ancient Greeks the edge of the known world.

The steppes to the north of the Black Sea is now generally accepted as the original homeland of the speakers of the Proto-Indo-European language (PIE).

Greek presence in the Black Sea began at least as early as the 9th century BC with colonies scattered along the Black Sea's southern coast, attracting traders and colonists due to the grain grown in the Black Sea hinterland.
By 500 BC, permanent Greek communities existed all around the Black Sea, and a lucrative trade-network connected the entirety of the Black Sea to the wider Mediterranean. While Greek colonies generally maintained very close cultural ties to their founding polis, Greek colonies in the Black Sea began to develop their own Black Sea Greek culture, known today as Pontic. The coastal communities of Black Sea Greeks remained a prominent part of the Greek world for centuries, and the realms of Mithridates of Pontus, Rome and Constantinople spanned the Black Sea to include Crimean territories.

The Black Sea became a virtual Ottoman Navy lake within five years of the Republic of Genoa losing control of the Crimean Peninsula in 1479, after which the only Western merchant vessels to sail its waters were those of Venice's old rival Ragusa. Black sea became a trade route of slaves between Crimea and Ottoman Anatolia. This restriction was challenged by the Russian Navy from 1783 until the relaxation of export controls in 1789 because of the French Revolution.

The Black Sea was a significant naval theatre of World War I (1914-1918) and saw both naval and land battles between 1941 and 1945 during World War II. During the 2022 Russian invasion of Ukraine, the Russian cruiser Moskva was sunk.

Archaeology

The Black Sea was sailed by Hittites, Carians, Colchians, Thracians, Greeks, Persians, Cimmerians, Scythians, Romans, Byzantines, Goths, Huns, Avars, Slavs, Varangians, Crusaders, Venetians, Genoese, Georgians, Bulgarians, Tatars and Ottomans.

The concentration of historical powers, combined with the preservative qualities of the deep anoxic waters of the Black Sea, has attracted increased interest from marine archaeologists who have begun to discover a large number of ancient ships and organic remains in a high state of preservation.

Economy and politics

The Black Sea plays an integral part in the connection between Asia and Europe. In addition to sea ports and fishing, key activities include hydrocarbons exploration for oil and natural gas, and tourism.

According to NATO, the Black Sea is a strategic corridor that provides smuggling channels for moving legal and illegal goods including drugs, radioactive materials, and counterfeit goods that can be used to finance terrorism.

Navigation
According to an International Transport Workers' Federation 2013 study, there were at least 30 operating merchant seaports in the Black Sea (including at least 12 in Ukraine). There were also around 2,400 commercial vessels operating in the Black Sea.

Fishing
The Turkish commercial fishing fleet catches around 300,000 tons of anchovies per year. The fishery is carried out mainly in winter, and the highest portion of the stock is caught between November and December.

Hydrocarbon exploration

In the 1980s, the Soviet Union started offshore drilling for petroleum in the sea's western portion (adjoining Ukraine's coast). Independent Ukraine continued and intensified that effort within its exclusive economic zone, inviting major international oil companies for exploration. Discovery of the new, massive oilfields in the area stimulated an influx of foreign investments. It also provoked a short-term peaceful territorial dispute with Romania which was resolved in 2011 by an international court redefining the exclusive economic zones between the two countries.

The Black Sea contains oil and natural gas resources but exploration in the sea is incomplete. , 20 wells are in place. Throughout much of its existence, the Black Sea has had significant oil and gas-forming potential because of significant inflows of sediment and nutrient-rich waters. However, this varies geographically. For example, prospects are poorer off the coast of Bulgaria because of the large influx of sediment from the Danube which obscured sunlight and diluted organic-rich sediments. Many of the discoveries to date have taken place offshore of Romania in the Western Black Sea and only a few discoveries have been made in the Eastern Black Sea.

During the Eocene, the Paratethys Sea was partially isolated and sea levels fell. During this time sand shed off the rising Balkanide, Pontide and Caucasus mountains trapped organic material in the Maykop Suite of rocks through the Oligocene and early Miocene. Natural gas appears in rocks deposited in the Miocene and Pliocene by the paleo-Dnieper and paleo-Dniester rivers, or in deep-water Oligocene-age rocks. Serious exploration began in 1999 with two deep-water wells, Limanköy-1 and Limanköy-2, drilled in Turkish waters. Next, the HPX (Hopa)-1 deepwater well targeted late Miocene sandstone units in Achara-Trialet fold belt (also known as the Gurian fold belt) along the Georgia-Turkey maritime border. Although geologists inferred that these rocks might have hydrocarbons that migrated from the Maykop Suite, the well was unsuccessful. No more drilling happened for five years after the HPX-1 well. Then in 2010, Sinop-1 targeted carbonate reservoirs potentially charged from the nearby Maykop Suite on the Andrusov Ridge, but the well-struck only Cretaceous volcanic rocks. Yassihöyük-1 encountered similar problems. Other Turkish wells, Sürmene-1 and Sile-1 drilled in the Eastern Black Sea in 2011 and 2015 respectively tested four-way closures above Cretaceous volcanoes, with no results in either case. A different Turkish well, Kastamonu-1 drilled in 2011 did successfully find thermogenic gas in Pliocene and Miocene shale-cored anticlines in the Western Black Sea. A year later in 2012, Romania drilled Domino-1 which struck gas prompting the drilling of other wells in the Neptun Deep. In 2016, the Bulgarian well Polshkov-1 targeted Maykop Suite sandstones in the Polshkov High and Russia is in the process of drilling Jurassic carbonates on the Shatsky Ridge as of 2018.

In August 2020, Turkey found  of natural gas in the biggest ever discovery in the Black Sea, and hoped to begin production in the Sakarya Gas Field by 2023. The sector is near where Romania has also found gas reserves.

Trans-sea cooperation

Urban areas

Tourism 

In the years following the end of the Cold War, the popularity of the Black Sea as a tourist destination steadily increased. Tourism at Black Sea resorts became one of the region's growth industries.

The following is a list of notable Black Sea resort towns:

 2 Mai (Romania)
 Agigea (Romania)
 Ahtopol (Bulgaria)
 Amasra (Turkey)
 Anaklia (Georgia)
 Anapa (Russia)
 Albena (Bulgaria)
 Alupka (Crimea, Ukraine/Russia (disputed))
 Alushta (Crimea, Ukraine/Russia (disputed))
 Balchik (Bulgaria)
 Batumi (Georgia)
 Burgas (Bulgaria)
 Byala (Bulgaria)
 Cap Aurora (Romania)
 Chakvi (Georgia)
 Constanța (Romania)
 Constantine and Helena (Bulgaria)
 Corbu (Romania)
 Costinești (Romania)
 Eforie (Romania)
 Emona (Bulgaria)
 Eupatoria (Crimea, Ukraine/Russia (disputed))
 Feodosiya (Crimea, Ukraine/Russia (disputed))
 Foros (Crimea, Ukraine/Russia (disputed))
 Gagra (Abkhazia, Georgia)
 Gelendzhik (Russia)
 Giresun (Turkey)
 Golden Sands (Bulgaria)
 Gonio (Georgia)
 Gudauta (Abkhazia, Georgia) and subsequently the Gudauta Bay
 Gurzuf (Crimea, Ukraine/Russia (disputed))
 Hopa (Artvin, Turkey)
 Jupiter (Romania)
 Kamchia (Bulgaria)
 Kavarna (Bulgaria)
 Kiten (Bulgaria)
 Kobuleti (Georgia)
 Koktebel (Crimea, Ukraine/Russia (disputed))
 Lozenetz (Bulgaria)
 Mamaia (Romania)
 Mangalia (Romania)
 Năvodari (Romania)
 Neptun (Romania)
 Nesebar (Bulgaria)
 Novorossiysk (Russia)
 Obzor (Bulgaria)
 Odessa (Ukraine)
 Olimp (Romania)
 Ordu (Turkey)
 Pitsunda (Abkhazia, Georgia)
 Pomorie (Bulgaria)
 Primorsko (Bulgaria)
 Rize (Turkey)
 Rusalka (Bulgaria)
 Samsun (Turkey)
 Saturn (Romania)
 Şile (Turkey)
 Sinop (Turkey)
 Skadovsk (Ukraine)
 Sochi (Russia)
 Sozopol (Bulgaria)
 Sudak (Crimea, Ukraine/Russia (disputed))
 Sulina (Romania)
 Sunny Beach (Bulgaria)
 Sveti Vlas (Bulgaria)
 Trabzon (Turkey)
 Tsikhisdziri (Georgia)
 Tuapse (Russia)
 Ureki (Georgia)
 Vama Veche (Romania)
 Varna (Bulgaria)
 Venus (Romania)
 Yalta (Crimea, Ukraine/Russia (disputed))
 Zonguldak (Turkey)

Modern military use 

The 1936 Montreux Convention provides for free passage of civilian ships between the international waters of the Black and the Mediterranean seas. However, a single country (Turkey) has complete control over the straits connecting the two seas. Military ships are categorised separately from civilian vessels and can pass through the straits only if the ship belongs to a Black Sea country. Other military ships have the right to pass through the straits if they are not in a war against Turkey and if they stay in the Black Sea basin for a limited time. The 1982 amendments to the Montreux Convention allow Turkey to close the straits at its discretion in both war and peacetime.

The Montreux Convention governs the passage of vessels between the Black, the Mediterranean and Aegean seas and the presence of military vessels belonging to non-littoral states in the Black Sea waters.

The Russian Black Sea Fleet has its official primary headquarters and facilities in the city of Sevastopol (Sevastopol Naval Base).

The Soviet hospital ship  was sunk on 7 November 1941 by German aircraft while evacuating civilians and wounded soldiers from Crimea. It has been estimated that approximately 5,000 to 7,000 people were killed during the sinking, making it one of the deadliest maritime disasters in history. There were only 8 survivors.

In December 2018, the Kerch Strait incident occurred, in which the Russian navy and coast guard took control of three Ukrainian vessels as the ships were trying to enter the Black Sea.

In April 2022, during the 2022 Russian invasion of Ukraine, the Russian cruiser Moskva was sunk in the western Black Sea by sea-skimming Neptune missiles of the Ukrainian armed forces while the Russians claimed that an onboard fire had caused munitions to explode and damage the ship extensively. She was the largest ship to be lost in naval combat in Europe since World War II.

See also
 Sea of Azov
 Kerch Strait
 Regions of Europe
 1927 Crimean earthquakes

Notes and references

Informational notes

Citations

General bibliography 

 
 Stella Ghervas, "Odessa et les confins de l'Europe: un éclairage historique", in Stella Ghervas et François Rosset (ed), Lieux d'Europe. Mythes et limites (Paris: Editions de la Maison des sciences de l'homme, 2008), pp. 107–124. 
 Charles King, The Black Sea: A History, 2004, 
 William Ryan and Walter Pitman, Noah's Flood, 1999, 
 Neal Ascherson, Black Sea (Vintage 1996), 
 
 Rüdiger Schmitt, "Considerations on the Name of the Black Sea", in: Hellas und der griechische Osten (Saarbrücken 1996), pp. 219–224
 
 
 Dimitrov, D. 2010. Geology and Non-traditional resources of the Black Sea . LAP Lambert Academic Publishing. . 244p.

External links

 Space Monitoring of the Black Sea Coastline and Waters
 Pictures of the Black sea coast all along the Crimean peninsula
 Black Sea Environmental Internet Node
 Black Sea-Mediterranean Corridor during the last 30 ky: UNESCO IGCP 521 WG12

 
Seas of the Mediterranean Sea
Anoxic waters
Back-arc basins
European seas
Seas of Russia
Seas of Turkey
Seas of Ukraine
Bodies of water of Bulgaria
Bodies of water of Georgia (country)
Bodies of water of Romania
Bodies of water of Crimea
Bulgaria–Romania border
Bulgaria–Turkey border
Georgia (country)–Russia border
Georgia (country)–Turkey border
Romania–Ukraine border
Russia–Ukraine border
Seas of the Atlantic Ocean
Seas of Asia
Geography of Southern Europe
Geography of Eastern Europe
Geography of Western Asia